Durandiella pseudotsugae is a plant pathogen which causes Dime canker in Douglas-fir trees.

References

External links 
 Index Fungorum
 USDA ARS Fungal Database

Fungal tree pathogens and diseases
Dermateaceae
Fungi described in 1962